The Cousin-Montauban ministry was the last government of the Second French Empire. It lasted from 10 August-4 September 1870. It was formed by Empress Eugenie in an attempt to rally France's defendes against the invading Prussians. The ministry was forced out of power following the French defeat at the Battle of Sedan.

Composition

 Head of government: Charles Cousin-Montauban
 President of the Council of State: Julien Busson-Billault
 Minister of War: Charles Cousin-Montauban
 Minister of Agriculture and Trade: Clément Duvernois
 Minister of Public Works: Jérôme David
 Minister of Education: Jules Brame (and of the Arts from 23 August 1870)
 Minister of the Navy Colonies: Charles Rigault de Genouilly
 Minister of Foreign Affairs: Henri La Tour d'Auvergne
 Minister of Justice and Religious Affairs: Michel Grandperret
 Minister of Finance: Pierre Magne
 Minister of the Interior: Henri Chevreau

References

 
1870 08
Empire 2

Cabinets disestablished in 1870